Operation Martin (Red) was an Allied clandestine operation of the Second World War to destroy a German airfield control tower at Bardufoss and organise secret military resistance groups in Tromsø in German-occupied Norway in 1943. 

The operation consisted of twelve Norwegian nationals falling under the Company Linge group, who had been trained by the British in Scotland and returned to Norway in March 1943.

Mission

Team members

 Løytnant Sigurd Eskeland
 Fenrik Jan Baalsrud
 Fenrik Per Blindheim
 Kaptein Sverre Odd Kverhellen
 Erik Reichelt
 Harald Peter Ratvik
 Bjørn Normann Bolstad
 Gabriel Salvesen
 Magnus Johan Kvalvik
 Frithjof M. Haugland
 Sjur Ludvigsen Trovaag
 Alfred A. Vik
 Cyrill J. Banzon

Failure
This operation was compromised when the Norwegian operatives, seeking a trusted local resistance contact, accidentally met an unaligned civilian shopkeeper with the same name as their contact, who reported them to the Germans.

The escape failed when the group's vessel MK  I was detected and attacked by the German  R56. To escape, MK  I was scuttled by its Norwegian crew by detonating  explosives with a time delay fuse. The crew fled in a small boat, which was promptly sunk by the Germans. Eleven Norwegian soldiers from the Company Linge died; one was shot at the site, ten were captured, interrogated, and tortured by the Gestapo and then executed in Tromsø. Jan Baalsrud managed to escape from Rebbenesøya to neutral Sweden; his three-month escape was made through Lyngen and Manndalen with the help of local villagers, during which he amputated nine toes to avoid the spread of gangrene.

Executions
The executions of the prisoners in Tromsø were investigated after the war under the case of Toftefjordsaken.

The Gestapo officers who tortured and executed eight of the MK "Bratholm 1" crew were ordered in the late summer of 1945 to dig up the bodies from the mass grave at Grønnåsen Skytebane, first with spades, then by hand, so as to not damage the bodies. They also had to wash the bodies before placing them in coffins.

The prosecution after the war became problematic as the main target, Kurt Stage, was not in Norwegian custody. Stage was executed in 1947 in Slovenia for war crimes there; no criminal proceedings were brought against the four others who were charged in the case.

In popular culture
Two films have been made based on Operation Martin: the 1957 Ni Liv (Nine Lives) and the 2017 Den 12. Mann (The 12th Man). The latter, directed by the Norwegian director Harald Zwart, stars Thomas Gullestad as Jan Baalsrud and Jonathan Rhys Meyers as Kurt Stage.

References

External links
 The truth about Jan Baalsrud and Operation "Martin" itromso.no

Battles and operations of World War II involving Norway
History of Troms
Conflicts in 1943
1943 in Norway